Monte Robert Geralds (September 10, 1934 – April 23, 2014) was an American politician and lawyer.

Born in Huntington, West Virginia, Geralds settled in Pleasant Ridge, Michigan and received his law degree from Wayne State University. He moved to Madison Heights, Michigan with his wife and practiced law. Geralds served on the Madison Heights City Council and was mayor.

Geralds was then elected to the Michigan House of Representatives as a Democrat. He was expelled from that body, after being convicted, in 1978 for having embezzled $24,000 from a client in his law practice.

Notes

Democratic Party members of the Michigan House of Representatives
Michigan city council members
Mayors of places in Michigan
Politicians from Huntington, West Virginia
People from Pleasant Ridge, Michigan
Wayne State University alumni
Michigan lawyers
1934 births
2014 deaths
Michigan politicians convicted of crimes
20th-century American politicians
20th-century American lawyers
Lawyers from Huntington, West Virginia